Go, You Redbirds is the fight song for the athletic teams of Illinois State University. It was written in 1932 by Kenyon S. Fletcher. The words have been changed from time to time. Prior to the fight song we know today, the Illinois State fight song was "Normal Loyalty." At sporting events when an ISU athletic team enters the field or floor, the students and fans sing the  first stanza of “Go, You Redbirds.” A new growing Redbird tradition amongst several redbird teams is to sing the fight song with the marching band to the home crowd after victories. The line "Lets win this game" is changed to "We've won this game."

Lyrics

References
Trophy, w. t., years, t. R., & [+], h. w. (n.d.). Illinois State University Official Athletic Site - Traditions. Illinois State University Official Athletic Site. Retrieved March 20, 2011, from https://web.archive.org/web/20110711113646/http://www.goredbirds.com/trads/ilsu-trads-school-songs.html
Trophy, w. t., years, t. R., & [+], h. w. (n.d.). Illinois State University Official Athletic Site - Traditions. Illinois State University Official Athletic Site. Retrieved March 20, 2011, from https://web.archive.org/web/20101231151811/http://www.goredbirds.com/trads/fight-song.html

American college songs
Illinois State Redbirds
Missouri Valley Conference fight songs
1932 songs